Chris Krause is the founder of the sports recruiting company NCSA College Recruiting (formerly National Collegiate Scouting Association), a private collegiate sports recruiting company in the United States.

Career
Krause grew up in Chicago, Illinois, where he played high school football.
Chris Krause later played collegiate football at Vanderbilt University, where he was a linebacker and nose guard.

Following his collegiate career, Chris Krause began working for recruiting service, College Prospects in the Chicago region. Chris Krause founded the National Collegiate Scouting Association (NCSA) in 2000.

Bibliography
Krause is the author of Athletes Wanted: The Complete Guidebook for Maximizing Athletic Scholarship and Life Potential.

References

Year of birth missing (living people)
Living people
American businesspeople
Vanderbilt University alumni